Phyllonorycter lautella is a moth of the family Gracillariidae. It is known from all of Europe, except the Mediterranean islands.

The wingspan is 6–7 mm. The head is black, face leaden -metallic. Antennae with apex white. Forewings ochreous-orange or golden -brown ; a silvery-white black-edged median streak from base to 2/3 and central sometimes interrupted fascia ; two costal and two dorsal posterior triangular silvery white spots, edged with black anteriorly and dorsal posteriorly.

There are two generations per year with adults on wing in May and again in August.

The larvae feed on Quercus dalechamii, Quercus petraea and Quercus robur. They mine the leaves of their host plant. They create a large, lower-surface tentiform mine, usually between two side veins. The lower epidermis has one sharp fold. The frass is deposited in a corner of the mine and covered by some spinning. There may be several mines in a single, strongly contracted leaf. The pupa is brownish black and is made in a whitish cocoon.

References

External links
Lepiforum.de
UK Moths

lautella
Moths of Europe
Moths described in 1846